Catch 21 is an American game show broadcast by Game Show Network (GSN). Created by Merrill Heatter (who also produced the show's predecessor Gambit), the series follows three contestants as they play a card game centered on blackjack and trivia. The show is based on a popular online game from GSN's website and aired for four seasons from 2008 to 2011. It was hosted by Alfonso Ribeiro, with actress Mikki Padilla serving as the card dealer.

The show received positive critical reception as a whole, the series itself was hailed as "a fun game with a solid concept" while Ribeiro was praised as "hands-down, one of the best game show hosts out there." Additionally, the series was acquired by Bounce TV in 2013, with the network hopeful it could "add fuel" to the channel's growing momentum. GSN revived the series on October 14, 2019, with Ribeiro returning to host and Witney Carson as the card dealer. As of 2021, reruns air on its sister channel GetTV.

Gameplay

Main game

2008 version
Three contestants are each given a card to start a blackjack hand from a standard 52-card deck shuffled prior to taping. The host reads questions and the first contestant to answer correctly is dealt a card. The contestant who answers correctly can freeze their hand, preventing them from receiving additional cards or reveal the next card from the top of the deck.

After revealing the card, the contestant can either accept it for themselves or pass it to one of their opponents who has not yet frozen. If keeping a card, the contestant in control is given another chance to freeze. However, once a contestant has frozen, the remaining contestants must freeze at a score higher than that contestant, ties are not permitted. A contestant is eliminated from the round if their hand exceeds 21.

The process is repeated with additional questions and cards until two contestants have frozen or busted. A contestant whose score reaches 21 exactly instantly wins the round. Beginning in season two of the original series, a bonus prize is given to the contestant regardless of the outcome of the game. If two contestants bust, the remaining contestant automatically wins the round. If only one contestant has not yet frozen or busted, no additional questions are asked; the remaining contestant continues drawing cards until either beating the highest frozen hand or busting. The winner of the round receives a power chip to use in the bonus round, assuming that contestant gets that far. The original series used point scores in the first two rounds, with 100 points awarded for a correct answer, and 500 points for winning the hand. After two rounds, the contestant with the lowest score is eliminated.

If there is a tie for the lowest score, the players involved participate in a high-card draw. Each player is given the choice of taking the first or second card off the top of the deck, without being able to see either card before making their selection. The player who draws the higher card advances.

The two remaining contestants play one more round involving the same toss-up question format, but point scores are not kept. The contestant who wins the round receives $1,000 and two additional power chips (originally one), then moves on to the bonus round.

2019 revival
The 2019 revival changed several aspects of the game:

 Other than the cards, there is no point scoring in any round.
 The question and answers are shown on-screen. Also, the contestants must wait until the entire question is read to ring in.
 There is no longer a bonus prize for the first 21.
 If two players win the first two hands, those two players play the third round, and the third player is eliminated. If the same player wins the first two hands, a tiebreaker is played between the other two players.
 In the tiebreaker ("High Card Playoff"), an additional trivia question is played. The player who answers correctly is shown the top card from the deck and chooses whether to take that card or pass it to their opponent and take the next card from the deck. The other player is given the second card; the higher card wins. (If there is a tie, an additional question is played.)
 Winning the final round gives the player their required number of power chips based on the hand or hands they have won. On some episodes, the player is given an additional chip for winning the match.

Bonus round
The winner now controls three separate hands, each staked with one card. A new deck of 52 cards that has been shuffled and cut is used. Cards are drawn for the contestant, one at a time and the contestant then chooses a hand in which to place each card. The contestant can use a power chip to dispose of an unwanted card. If the contestant is in danger of busting on any hand, the contestant can end the round after successfully placing a card; a contestant cannot stop immediately after playing a power chip. Getting 21 in one hand wins $1,000, in two hands wins $5,000, and if 21 is scored on all three hands, the contestant wins the grand prize of $25,000. If the contestant busts on any one hand, the bonus money is forfeited and the game ends. On some episodes in season two, the top prize was increased to $50,000 with the other payouts remaining the same.

The 2019 revival has altered the payout structure to a 21 on one hand awarding $2,500, $5,000 for two, and $25,000 for all three. In the original series, any money won in the bonus round was awarded in addition to the $1,000 for winning (i.e. $25,000 winners actually won $26,000 total); in the revival, the contestant only won the bonus game winnings, or $1,000 if they  busted or did not score any 21s.

Online game
The television version of the game was based on a popular online version from GSN's website. In this version, the online player has five minutes to make as many hands of 21 as they can using four columns. The player can play a card in any of their columns as long as the subsequent total is 21 or less. If the card cannot be played in any column, it must be discarded. Each hand of 21 earns the player 50 points. Playing exactly five cards in a column earns the player a 50-point bonus (called a "5-Card Charlie"), making that column worth a total of 100 points. Additionally, the jacks of spades and clubs allow any column to be cleared immediately for 75 points (called a "Blackjack Attack").

Production

The series featured executive producers Scott Sternberg and Merrill Heatter, and premiered on July 21, 2008. The first season consisted of 40 half-hour episodes. Prior to the show's premiere, a 30-minute documentary The Making of a Game Show: Catch 21 aired on GSN, featuring exclusive footage and interviews with production staff and Ribeiro. The name of the show is inspired by Catch-22, a phrase describing a paradox that cannot be avoided due to limits or a rules contradiction.

On February 18, 2009, GSN renewed the series for a 65-episode second season on April 6, 2009, which featured the addition of an extra power chip in the bonus round in order to increase contestant's chances of winning the top prize. A third season, which was announced on September 16, 2009, debuted on October 12, 2009, with some episodes featuring celebrities with a common bond (such as three The Fresh Prince of Bel-Air cast members or three former child stars) playing for charity. The show's fourth and final season debuted on August 16, 2010.

On March 21, 2019, Adweek reported that GSN would revive Catch 21, producing new episodes for the first time in nearly a decade. Ribeiro was chosen to return as host; Padilla, however, would not return and would be replaced with dancer Witney Carson. The change reunited Ribeiro and Carson, who had previously been partners—and champions—on season nineteen of Dancing with the Stars. Contestants cast for the revival were all current residents of Las Vegas, which is where the show is filmed. The revival filmed its episodes in July and August, and premiered on GSN on October 14, 2019.

Reception
Critical reception for Catch 21 was generally positive. Carrie Grosvenor of About Entertainment argued that the series was "a fun game with a solid concept. It's definitely worth checking out." Hollywood Junket also praised Ribeiro, calling him "hands-down, one of the best game show hosts out there... the fun, brother/sister type chemistry between himself and (Padilla) is rare and benefits the show greatly." Additionally, Bounce TV expressed excitement when announcing their acquisition of the series in 2013, citing the series' popularity among GSN viewers and consistent ratings growth during its original run. The network's chief operating officer Jonathan Katz commented, "We are very confident that the broadcast premieres of The American Bible Challenge and Catch 21 will add fuel to Bounce TV's skyrocketing growth." The revival's October 14, 2019, premiere earned 459,000 total viewers with a 0.04 rating in the 18–49 demographic.

References

External links
 
 

2000s American game shows
2008 American television series debuts
2010s American game shows
2011 American television series endings
2019 American television series debuts
2020s American game shows
2020 American television series endings
American television series revived after cancellation
Television shows about blackjack
English-language television shows
Game Show Network original programming
Television series by Heatter-Quigley Productions
Television shows filmed in Los Angeles
Television shows set in the Las Vegas Valley